The Socialist League (Spanish: Liga Socialista) was a Venezuelan political party. It was established in 1973 in a split from the Revolutionary Left Movement, and merged into PSUV in 2007. The League was co-founded by Jorge Antonio Rodriguez; he was its Secretary General when he was murdered on 25 July 1976, having been kidnapped and tortured by state security forces.

References

1973 establishments in Venezuela
2007 disestablishments in Venezuela
Bolivarian Revolution
Communist parties in Venezuela
Defunct communist parties
Defunct political parties in Venezuela
Political parties disestablished in 2007
Political parties established in 1973
United Socialist Party of Venezuela